The Youth Daily is a daily newspaper published in Shanghai, and the official newspaper of the China Youth League Shanghai Committee. It is the first newspaper aimed to youth in P.R. China, and its establishment was approved by Deng Xiaoping.

It was affiliated with the Jiefang Daily from September 16, 1949, to February 14, 1952. It was forced to stop publishing in the Cultural Revolution in December 1966, and was restarted on June 10, 1979. On January 1, 1995, it became a daily.

Nowadays, Life Weekly (1985), Touch Youth and Students' Post are three main sub-publications of Youth Daily.

References

External links 
 Official Website

Newspapers published in Shanghai
Chinese-language newspapers (Simplified Chinese)
Publications established in 1949
1949 establishments in China
Communist Youth League of China
Chinese Communist Party newspapers